Hoffman Marsh is a wetlands on San Francisco Bay in Richmond, California.  The marsh has been protected within Eastshore State Park, and adjacent to Point Isabel Regional Shoreline.  The marsh is an important nesting ground for wildfowl and stopping ground on the Pacific Flyway, as it is one of only a handful of undestroyed wetlands in the Bay Area. It borders Point Isabel Regional Shoreline and Interstate 80.

Hoffman Channel
Hoffman Marsh is the delta for the mouth of Fluvius Innominatus creek into the Hoffman Channel, which lead to San Francisco Bay. Hoffman Channel is a constructed channel that runs between Point Isabel Regional Shoreline and North Point Isabel, both of which are landfill. The marsh is bounded on the west by the San Francisco Bay Trail, which runs along a berm built by Santa Fe Railroad. After the berm was built, Hoffman Marsh developed behind it.

Development proposal
There was a controversial proposal to add a 98,000 sq. ft. (9,100 m2) Kohl's department store on a site between the Costco store and the marsh. Many residents were worried about potential negative effects on increased nighttime lighting that will make endangered birds such as the California clapper rail and salt marsh harvest mouse more susceptible to predators. This is in addition to other birds that make overnight stopovers at the marsh that would also possibly decrease in number and therefore reduce biodiversity. The Richmond Annex Neighborhood Council officially opposed the project.

Park
Hoffman Marsh was saved from development, to be protected within Eastshore State Park. Habitat restoration plans are being developed.

See also
Parks in Richmond, California
Point Isabel (promontory)

References

External links
Panoramic photo of Hoffman Marsh

Geography of Richmond, California
Parks in Richmond, California
Wetlands of the San Francisco Bay Area
Marshes of California
Landforms of Contra Costa County, California